The 2008–09 División de Honor Juvenil de Fútbol season was the 23rd since its establishment.

Regular season

Copa de Campeones

Group A

1st round

2nd round

Group B

Final

Details

See also
2009 Copa del Rey Juvenil

External links
 Royal Spanish Football Federation website

2008–09
Juvenil